Szydłowiec may refer to the following places:
Szydłowiec, Greater Poland Voivodeship (west-central Poland)
Szydłowiec in Masovian Voivodeship (east-central Poland)
Szydłowiec, Subcarpathian Voivodeship (south-east Poland)